Peter Luczak chose not to defend his 2008 title.
Pablo Cuevas became the new champion, after beating Nicolás Lapentti 7–5, 6–1 in the final.

Seeds

Draw

Final four

Top half

Bottom half

References
 Main Draw
 Qualifying Draw

2009 ATP Challenger Tour
2009 Singles
2009 in Uruguayan tennis